Social choice theory or social choice is a theoretical framework for analysis of combining individual opinions, preferences, interests, or welfares to reach a collective decision or social welfare in some sense. Whereas choice theory is concerned with individuals making choices based on their preferences, social choice theory is concerned with how to translate the preferences of individuals into the preferences of a group. A non-theoretical example of a collective decision is enacting a law or set of laws under a constitution. Another example is voting, where individual preferences over candidates are collected to elect a person that best represents the group's preferences. 

Social choice blends elements of welfare economics and public choice theory. It is methodologically individualistic, in that it aggregates preferences and behaviors of individual members of society. Using elements of formal logic for generality, analysis proceeds from a set of seemingly reasonable axioms of social choice to form a social welfare function (or constitution). Results uncovered the logical incompatibility of various axioms, as in Arrow's theorem, revealing an aggregation problem and suggesting reformulation or theoretical triage in dropping some axiom(s).

Overlap with public choice theory 

"Public choice" and "social choice" are heavily overlapping fields of endeavor.

Social choice and public choice theory may overlap but are disjoint if narrowly construed. The Journal of Economic Literature classification codes place Social Choice under Microeconomics at JEL D71 (with Clubs, Committees, and Associations) whereas most Public Choice subcategories are in JEL D72 (Economic Models of Political Processes: Rent-Seeking, Elections, Legislatures, and Voting Behavior).

Social choice theory (and public choice theory) dates from Condorcet's formulation of the voting paradox, though it arguably goes back further to Ramon Llull's 1299 publication.

Kenneth Arrow's Social Choice and Individual Values (1951), Arrow's impossibility theorem and often acknowledged as the basis of the modern social choice theory and public choice theory. In addition to Arrow's theorem and the voting paradox, the Gibbard–Satterthwaite theorem, the Condorcet jury theorem, the median voter theorem, and May's theorem are among the more well known results from social choice theory.

Amartya Sen's Nobel Prize winning work was also highly influential.  See the #Interpersonal utility comparison section below for more about Sen's work.

Later work also considers approaches to compensations and fairness, liberty and rights, axiomatic domain restrictions on preferences of agents, variable populations, strategy-proofing of social-choice mechanisms, natural resources, capabilities and functionings, and welfare, justice, and poverty.

Interpersonal utility comparison

Social choice theory is the study of theoretical and practical methods to aggregate or combine individual preferences into a collective social welfare function. The field generally assumes that individuals have preferences, and it follows that they can be modeled using utility functions. But much of the research in the field assumes that those utility functions are internal to humans, lack a meaningful unit of measure and cannot be compared across different individuals Whether this type of interpersonal utility comparison is possible or not significantly alters the available mathematical structures for social welfare functions and social choice theory.

In one perspective, following Jeremy Bentham, utilitarians have argued that preferences and utility functions of individuals are interpersonally comparable and may therefore be added together to arrive at a measure of aggregate utility.  Utilitarian ethics call for maximizing this aggregate.

In contrast many twentieth century economists, following Lionel Robbins, questioned whether mental states, and the utilities they reflect, can be measured and, a fortiori, interpersonal comparisons of utility as well as the social choice theory on which it is based. Consider for instance the law of diminishing marginal utility, according to which utility of an added quantity of a good decreases with the amount of the good that is already in possession of the individual.  It has been used to defend transfers of wealth from the "rich" to the "poor" on the premise that the former do not derive as much utility as the latter from an extra unit of income. Robbins (1935, pp. 138–40) argues that this notion is beyond positive science; that is, one cannot measure changes in the utility of someone else, nor is it required by positive theory.

Apologists of the interpersonal comparison of utility have argued that Robbins claimed too much. John Harsanyi agrees that full comparability of mental states such as utility is never possible but believes, however, that human beings are able to make some interpersonal comparisons of utility because they share some common backgrounds, cultural experiences, etc.  In the example from Amartya Sen (1970, p. 99), it should be possible to say that Emperor Nero's gain from burning Rome was outweighed by the loss incurred by the rest of the Romans. Harsanyi and Sen thus argue that at least partial comparability of utility is possible, and social choice theory proceeds under that assumption.

Sen proposes, however, that comparability of interpersonal utility need not be partial.  Under Sen's theory of informational broadening, even complete interpersonal comparison of utility would lead to socially suboptimal choices because mental states are malleable. A starving peasant may have a particularly sunny disposition and thereby derive high utility from a small income. This fact should not nullify, however, his claim to compensation or equality in the realm of social choice.

Social decisions should accordingly be based on immalleable factors. Sen proposes interpersonal utility comparisons based on a wide range of data. His theory is concerned with access to advantage, viewed as an individual's access to goods that satisfy basic needs (e.g., food), freedoms (in the labor market, for instance), and capabilities. We can proceed to make social choices based on real variables, and thereby address actual position, and access to advantage. Sen's method of informational broadening allows social choice theory to escape the objections of Robbins, which looked as though they would permanently harm social choice theory.

Additionally, since the seminal results of Arrow's impossibility theorem and the Gibbard–Satterthwaite theorem, many positive results focusing on the restriction of the domain of preferences of individuals have elucidated such topics as optimal voting. The initial results emphasized the impossibility of satisfactorily providing a social choice function free of dictatorship and inefficiency in the most general settings.  Later results have found natural restrictions that can accommodate many desirable properties.

Empirical studies 

Since Arrow social choice analysis has primarily been characterized by being extremely theoretical and formal in character.  However, since ca. 1960 attention began to be paid to empirical applications of social choice theoretical insights, first and foremost by American political scientist William H. Riker.

The vast majority of such studies have been focused on finding empirical examples of the Condorcet paradox.

A summary of 37 individual studies, covering a total of 265 real-world elections, large and small, found 25 instances of a Condorcet paradox, for a total likelihood of 9.4% (and this may be a high estimate, since cases of the paradox are more likely to be reported on than cases without).  On the other hand, the empirical identification of a Condorcet paradox presupposes extensive data on the decision-makers' preferences over all alternatives—something that is only very rarely available.

While examples of the paradox seem to occur occasionally in small settings (e.g., parliaments) very few examples have been found in larger groups (e.g. electorates), although some have been identified.

Rules 
Let  be a set of possible 'states of the world' or 'alternatives'. For example, in a single-winner election,  may represent the set of candidates; in a resource allocation setting,  may represent all possible allocations.

Let  be a finite set, representing a collection of individuals.  For each , let  be a utility function, describing the amount of happiness an individual i derives from each possible state.

The question of what 'best' means is the basic question of social choice theory. The following rules are most common:
The utilitarian rule - also called the max-sum rule - aims to maximize the sum of utilities, thus maximizing the efficiency.
The egalitarian rule - also called the max-min rule - aims to maximize the smallest utility, thus maximizing the fairness.
The proportional-fair rule - sometimes called the max-product rule - aims to balance between the previous two rules, attaining a balance between efficiency and fairness.

Functions 
A social choice function or a voting rule takes an individuals' complete and transitive preferences over a set of candidates (also called alternatives), and returns some subset of (possible singular) the candidates. We can think of this subset as the winners of an election. This is different from social welfare function, which returns a linear order of the set of alternatives as opposed to simply selecting some subset. We can compare different social choice functions based on which axioms or mathematical properties they fulfill. For example, Instant-runoff voting satisfies the Independence of clones criterion, whereas the Borda count does not; conversely, Borda Count satisfies the Monotonicity criterion whereas IRV does not.

Theorems 
Arrow's impossibility theorem is what often comes to mind when one thinks about impossibility theorems in voting. However, Arrow was concerned with social welfare functions, not social choice functions. There are several famous theorems concerning social choice functions. The Gibbard–Satterthwaite theorem states that all non-dictatorial voting rules that is resolute (it always returns a single winner no matter what the ballots are) and non-imposed (every alternative could be chosen) with more than three alternatives (candidates) is manipulable. That is, a voter can cast a ballot that misrepresents their preferences to obtain a result that is more favorable to them under their sincere preferences. The Campbell-Kelley theorem states that, if there exists a Condorcet winner, then selecting that winner is the unique resolute, neutral, anonymous, and non-manipulable voting rule.  May's theorem states that when there are only two candidates, Simple majority vote is the unique neutral, anonymous, and positively responsive voting rule.

See also

 Compensation principle
 Computational social choice
 Condorcet paradox
 Emotional choice theory
 Extended sympathy
 Game theory
 Group decision-making
 Justice (economics)
 Liberal paradox
 Mechanism design
 Nakamura number
 Rational choice theory
 Rule according to higher law
 Voting system

Notes

References 
Arrow, Kenneth J. (1951, 2nd ed., 1963). Social Choice and Individual Values, New York: Wiley. 
_, (1972). "General Economic Equilibrium: Purpose, Analytic Techniques, Collective Choice", Nobel Prize Lecture, Link to text, with Section 8 on the theory and background.
_, (1983). Collected Papers, v. 1, Social Choice and Justice, Oxford: Blackwell 
 Arrow, Kenneth J., Amartya K. Sen, and Kotaro Suzumura, eds. (1997). Social Choice Re-Examined, 2 vol., London: Palgrave Macmillan  & 
_, eds. (2002). Handbook of Social Choice and Welfare, v. 1. Chapter-preview links.
_, ed. (2011). Handbook of Social Choice and Welfare, v. 2, Amsterdam: Elsevier. Chapter-preview links.
 Bossert, Walter and John A. Weymark (2008). "Social Choice (New Developments)," The New Palgrave Dictionary of Economics, 2nd Edition, London: Palgrave Macmillan Abstract.
 Dryzek, John S. and Christian List (2003). "Social Choice Theory and Deliberative Democracy: A Reconciliation," British Journal of Political Science, 33(1), pp. 1-28, https://www.jstor.org/discover/10.2307/4092266?uid=3739936&uid=2&uid=4&uid=3739256&sid=21102056001967, 2002 PDF link.
 Feldman, Allan M. and Roberto Serrano (2006). Welfare Economics and Social Choice Theory, 2nd ed., New York: Springer ,  Arrow-searchable chapter previews.
 Fleurbaey, Marc (1996). Théories économiques de la justice, Paris: Economica. 

 Harsanyi, John C. (1987). "Interpersonal Utility Comparisons," The New Palgrave: A Dictionary of Economics, v. 2, London: Palgrave, pp. 955–58.

 

Robbins, Lionel (1935). An Essay on the Nature and Significance of Economic Science, 2nd ed., London: Macmillan, ch. VI
 , (1938). "Interpersonal Comparisons of Utility: A Comment," Economic Journal, 43(4), 635–41.
Sen, Amartya K. (1970 [1984]). Collective Choice and Social Welfare, New York: Elsevier  Description.
_, (1998). "The Possibility of Social Choice", Nobel Prize Lecture .
 _, (1987). "Social Choice," The New Palgrave: A Dictionary of Economics, v. 4, London: Palgrave, pp. 382–93.
 _, (2008). "Social Choice,". The New Palgrave Dictionary of Economics, 2nd Edition, London: Palgrave Abstract.
 . A comprehensive reference from a computational perspective; see Chapter 9. Downloadable free online.
 Suzumura, Kotaro (1983). Rational Choice, Collective Decisions, and Social Welfare, Cambridge: Cambridge University Press

External links

Social Choice Bibliography by J. S. Kelly 
Electowiki, a wiki covering many subjects of social choice and voting theory

 
Ethical theories
Political science
Public economics
Applied mathematics
Collective intelligence
Social epistemology
Mathematical economics
Law and economics